Hrašovík is a village and municipality in Košice-okolie District in the Košice Region of eastern Slovakia.

History
Historically, the village was first mentioned in 1270.

Geography
The village lies at an altitude of 215 metres and covers an area of 2.05 km².
It has a population of 300 people.

Genealogical resources

The records for genealogical research are available at the state archive "Statny Archiv in Kosice, Slovakia"

 Roman Catholic church records (births/marriages/deaths): 1834-1896 (parish B)
 Greek Catholic church records (births/marriages/deaths): 1773-1905 (parish B)
 Lutheran church records (births/marriages/deaths): 1749-1894 (parish B)
 Reformated church records (births/marriages/deaths): 1753-1896 (parish B)

Notable people
Vincent Kavečanský, physicist

See also
 List of municipalities and towns in Slovakia

External links
 Statistics 
 Contacts
 Complex urban map
Surnames of living people in Hrasovik

Villages and municipalities in Košice-okolie District